Guaranda is a city in central Ecuador. It is the capital of Bolívar province located in the Andes mountains. The city is connected by road with other hubs, including Riobamba, Babahoyo and Ambato.

Guaranda is a market town located in a valle – a deep valley in the high Andes, serving a vast hinterland of agricultural settlements ("comunidades") peopled by Quechua Indians. Its climate is subtropical, with a long (May – October) dry season ("estio"). Its population is mainly mestizo, but includes many people of different ethnicities. Supposedly, the city was first colonized by Jewish Conversos fleeing from Lima's Inquisition. This nucleus has been intermarrying for almost five centuries, forming a compact population linked by family connections. Since the 1990s, the indigenous majority has seized political power and most of the local elected officers are of Quechua origin.

The city has 55,374 inhabitants (2011 census) and is growing. It suffers severe problems of electricity and water supply. Water is drawn from high surface sources, mostly from the Chimborazo glacier, and is of good drinking quality. The city is known for its week-long Carnaval and for its "Pajaro Azul" alcoholic drink.

History

The city was founded by Spanish explorers in 1571, but wasn't officially recognized until November 11, 1811. The city celebrates its independence day on November 10, commemorating the day the city definitively declared its independence from the Spanish.

Guaranda weathered earthquakes in 1674 and 1775, sustaining significant damage, but rebuilding both times. After the 1775 earthquake, it took almost four years to rebuild the city.

The city was declared an official Ecuadorian cultural center on October 23, 1997, reflecting the historic architecture of the urban center.

Geography

Like Rome, Guaranda is built upon seven hills. From the city, Chimborazo is in view most days.

The downtown area is situated around Parque Libertador Simon Bolivar, named for the heroic liberator, Simon Bolivar. In the park, a statue of Bolivar designed by famous Ecuadorian artist Oswaldo Guayasamín can be found.

Political Division 
Guaranda including urban and rural area has around 65000 inhabitants because politically it joins 11 parishes

Urban Parishes 

 Angel Polibio Chávez
 Gabriel Ignacio Veintimilla
 Guanujo

Rural Parishes 

 Facundo Vela
 Julio Moreno
 Salinas
 San Lorenzo
 San Luís de Pambil
 San Simón
 Santa Fé
 Simiatug

Sister cities
 Haeju, North Korea

References

External links
City of Guaranda (Spanish)

Populated places in Bolívar Province (Ecuador)
Provincial capitals in Ecuador